The Jussi Awards are Finland's premier film industry prizes, awarded annually to recognize the achievements of directors, actors, and writers.

History

The first Jussi Awards ceremony was held on 16 November 1944 at the Restaurant Adlon in Helsinki. The award is one of the oldest films awards in Europe.

The original planned name for the prize was Aino, but Jussi won in the end. The name comes from a character in the 1924 and 1936 Pohjalaisia films.

The awards were originally organized by the Elokuvajournalistit organization, but the task was transferred in the early 1960s to the Filmiaura organization, composed of around 300 members working in the Finnish film industry. Because of the controversy surrounding the transfer, no awards were handed out in 1960 and 1961.

Description

The award trophy is a gypsum statuette depicting a standing man with a hat, based on the character of Jussi in the aforementioned films. It was designed by sculptor Ben Renvall. Modernly they are hand-made by Renvall's son Seppo Renvall.

Categories

All winners except in the public favorite category are chosen in a closed vote by Filmiaura, an association of roughly 260 film professionals. The categories are:

Best Film
Best Director
Best Actor
Best Actress
Best Supporting Actor
Best Supporting Actress
Best Screenplay
Best Cinematography
Best Original Score
Best Editing
Best Sound Design
Best Production Design
Best Costume Design
Best Documentary
Best Makeup
Best Short Film

References

External links

Official homepage
Jussi awards at the Internet Movie Database

 
Finnish film awards
Awards established in 1944